"Way Down Now" is a song by British musical group World Party. It was released at the first single for their 1990 album Goodbye Jumbo. The song contains a nod to "Sympathy for the Devil" by the Rolling Stones. When released as a single in 1990, the song topped the US Billboard Modern Rock Tracks chart, reached No. 21 on the Album Rock Tracks chart, and peaked at No. 10 in the Netherlands.

Formats and track listings
All songs by Karl Wallinger except where noted

European 7-inch single (113 381)
 "Way Down Now" – 3:49
 "Nature Girl" – 4:59

European maxi-single (663 381)
 "Way Down Now" – 3:49
 "You're All Invited to the Party" – 4:30
 "Happiness Is a Warm Gun (John Lennon, Paul McCartney)" – 2:28
 "Nature Girl" – 4:59

Charts

References

External links

1990 singles
Chrysalis Records singles
Ensign Records singles
Songs written by Karl Wallinger
World Party songs